Sansankidé is a rural commune and village in the Cercle of Diéma in the Kayes Region of western Mali. The commune includes the villages of Kamissakidé, Lecouraga, Léwa-Khassonké, Sambadigané, Sangha-Madina as well as Sansankidé, the administrative center (chef-lieu). In the 2009 census the commune had a population of 6,520.

References

Communes of Kayes Region